Scaphium macropodum is a tree species in the family Malvaceae, subfamily Sterculioideae (previously placed in the Sterculiaceae).  No subspecies are listed in the Catalogue of Life; there is little concern about its conservation status.

Scaphium macropodum may be known as the "malva nut tree", although this name is also applied to the similar Scaphium affine.  It is found in Cambodia, Indonesia, Malaysia, Singapore, Thailand, and Vietnam (where it is called (cay) ươi).

It has culinary and traditional medicinal uses: in Malaysia for treating fevers, phlegm, coughs and sore throats, respiratory conditions, and to improve general health.

References

External links

macropodum
Flora of Indo-China
Flora of Malesia
Trees of Vietnam
Least concern plants
Taxonomy articles created by Polbot